Vasily Dmitrievich Kryuchenkin (January 13, 1894 – June 10, 1976, Kyiv) was a Soviet Lieutenant general during World War II who commanded several armies.

Before World War II 
He was born in the village of Karpovka in the Orenburg Oblast, in a peasants' family, and had seven siblings. 
In 1915 he joined the Russian Army and fought on Western Front as a Non-commissioned officer. 

After the outbreak of the October Revolution, he joined the Red Guard in 1917 and the Red Army in 1918. He participated in several battles and was commander of a cavalry platoon, a squadron, assistant commander of the regiment, and Commander of a cavalry regiment. 

After the end of the war, Kryuchenkin continued to serve with the 11th Cavalry Division. In October 1921, he was appointed acting commander of the 63rd Cavalry Regiment, leading it in the suppression of the Revolutionary Insurrectionary Army of Ukraine, the forces of Talak and Savinkov and other opponents of the Soviets in Belorussia. In late November he was sent to study at the Kiev Combined Military School. After graduating in September 1923, Kryuchenkin returned to the 11th Cavalry Division and served as an assistant squadron commander and acting assistant commander of the 64th Cavalry Regiment for personnel. From June 1924 he served as acting regimental commander, then as chief of the regimental school of the 62nd Cavalry Regiment. During this period he fought in battles against the Basmachi movement in the region of Samarkand, Dushanbe, and the Afghan border. From September 1925 to September 1926, Kryuchenkin completed the Cavalry Officers Improvement Course at Novocherkassk, and on his return to the division was appointed to the 44th Cavalry Regiment as chief and politruk of the regimental school. He served as secretary of the regimental party bureau between September 1927 and August 1928. In December 1928, Kryuchenkin was sent to the Volga Military District, where he served with the 46th Cavalry Regiment of the 8th Cavalry Division as chief and politruk of the regimental school and regimental chief of staff.   

Returning to the 11th Cavalry Division in January 1931, he served with it as commander and commissar of the 48th Cavalry Regiment, and assistant commander for the political section of the 45th Cavalry Regiment. From May 1933, he served as assistant commander for supply of the 13th Cavalry Regiment of the 2nd Cavalry Division of the Ukrainian Military District. From November 1934 to May 1935, Kryuchenkin returned to studies, completing the Cavalry Senior Commanders Improvement Course at Novocherkassk. After completing the course, he was appointed assistant commander for supply of the 16th Cavalry Regiment of the 3rd Bessarabia Cavalry Division of the Kiev Military District. In April 1936 he transferred to serve as chief of military supply of the 5th M. F. Blinov Stavropol Cavalry Division. From September 1937 he commanded the 111th Cavalry Regiment of the 28th Cavalry Division, then in June 1938 was appointed commander of the 14th Cavalry Division in the Kiev Special Military District.

World War II 

After Germany's attack on the Soviet Union, the division fought in the area of Kremenets and Berdychiv, where it was surrounded. After 6 days of fighting, the division was able to break through and escape. 
In November 1941 he became commander of the 5th Cavalry Corps, which he commanded during the Yelets Offensive, Barvenkovo–Lozovaya Offensive, the Second Battle of Kharkov and Battle of Voronezh (1942). 

In July 1942, he became commander of the 28th Army, and a few weeks later of the 4th Tank Army, which he commanded until December 1942. Then he followed a course at the Military Academy of the General Staff of the Armed Forces of Russia. After its completion in March 1943, he was appointed commander of the 69th Army, which he led during the Battle of Kursk. In April 1944 he became commander of the 10th Army and then of the 33rd Army, with which he participated in the Battle of the Dnieper. 

In the period from July to October 1944 he was hospitalized for illness, and after he was cured in December 1944, he became a member of the Military Council of the 1st Belorussian Front. In January 1945, he became deputy commander of the 61st Army and then deputy commander of the 1st Belarusian front. 
At the end of the war he was deputy commander of the Don Military District. 

In 1946, he was transferred to the reserve. He lived in Kyiv until his death.

References

Citations

Bibliography 
 
This is a translation of an article in the Polish Wikipedia, Wasilij Kriuczenkin.
Generals.dk

1894 births
1976 deaths
Soviet lieutenant generals
Recipients of the Order of the Red Banner
Recipients of the Order of Suvorov, 1st class
Recipients of the Order of Kutuzov, 1st class
Recipients of the Order of the Cross of Grunwald, 1st class
Soviet military personnel of World War II
Military personnel from Kyiv
Military Academy of the General Staff of the Armed Forces of the Soviet Union alumni